Page County is the name of two counties in the United States:

 Page County, Iowa
 Page County, Virginia

See also
 Puge County, a county in Sichuan Province, China